Korsch  is the name of:
 Karl Korsch  (1886–1961), German communist
 Peter Korsch, East German sprint canoer
 Mount Korsch, pyramidal peak; named 1988 after a geologist Russell J. Korsch
 Korsch telescope, a three-mirror telescope

See also 
 Korsch AG, German mechanical engineering company, manufacturer of tablet presses
 Körsch Viaduct, Körsch Valley
 Horst Korsching (1912–1998), German physicist
 Korsh
 Korzh
 Related surnames
 Kürschner, Kirschner

German-language surnames
Occupational surnames